Cotham, Nottinghamshire is a small village near Newark-on-Trent in the East Midlands of England.

Population
At the 2011 Census, the village population remained less than 100. It is now included in the civil parish of Staunton, as part of Newark and Sherwood District.

Heritage
Francis White's Directory of Nottinghamshire described Cotham in 1853: 
The church was partly rebuilt, a porch being added, and new pews in 1832. The living is a donative valued at £35, and is now enjoyed by the Rev. John Ince Maltby of Shelton. This place was long the seat of the knightly families of Leek and Markham, but it is now divided into three farms, occupied by John Booth, William Hodgkinson and Thomas Rose, the latter of whom resides at Cotham Lodge, a pleasant residence, commanding fine prospects.

The village had a railway station on the Great Northern Railway line between Newark North Gate and Nottingham Victoria via Bingham from 1879 to 1939. The line itself closed in 1955.

Anglican church
St Michael's Church, Cotham, stands back from the village. It dates from the 12th century and is a Grade II* listed building, but it is now redundant.

Notes

External links

Civil parishes in Nottinghamshire
Villages in Nottinghamshire
Newark and Sherwood